The 1941 Humboldt State Lumberjacks football team represented Humboldt State College during the 1941 college football season. This was the last team Humboldt State fielded until 1946. They competed as an independent in 1941 and became a member of the Far Western Conference (FWC) as of the 1946 season.

The 1941 Lumberjacks were led by head coach Earl Hoos in his only season as head coach at Humboldt State. They played home games at Albee Stadium in Eureka, California. Humboldt State finished with a record of two wins, five losses and one tie (2–5–1). The Lumberjacks were outscored by their opponents 46–115 for the season.

Schedule

Notes

References

Humboldt State
Humboldt State Lumberjacks football seasons
Humboldt State Lumberjacks football